Brandon Micheal Hall (born February 3, 1993) is an American actor. On television, he starred as the lead of the ABC sitcom The Mayor (2017) and the CBS comedy-drama God Friended Me (2018–2020). Hall also appeared as a series regular on the TBS / HBO Max dark comedy Search Party (2016–2022).

Early life
Hall was born on February 3, 1993, in Anderson, South Carolina, and raised by his single mother, a minister. He attended Pendleton High School for his freshman and sophomore years, before transferring to South Carolina Governor's School for the Arts & Humanities in Greenville. Hall went on to study drama at the Juilliard School in New York City, from which he graduated in 2015.

Career

Film
Hall was in Cecile on the Phone (2017). He was in Monster Party (2018) and Lez Bomb (2018). Hall was in the romantic comedy film Always a Bridesmaid (2019) as Kenny directed by Trey Haley and written by Yvette Nicole Brown, her first screenplay.
.

Television
Hall was cast in the 2015 pilot for LFE, directed by David Slade, but the pilot did not receive a series order. A year later, Hall landed his first series regular role on the TBS dark comedy Search Party as Julius Marcus, a journalist and former boyfriend of series lead Dory Sief (Alia Shawkat). He appeared in the main cast for the first two seasons and was a guest star in the third and fourth seasons. Hall was subsequently cast in the title role of the ABC sitcom The Mayor in 2017, portraying an aspiring rapper who inadvertently becomes mayor of his hometown. The series received positive reviews, but was cancelled after one season.

Hall portrayed Miles Finer, an outspoken atheist who helps people needing assistance after receiving a Facebook friend request from an individual identifying as God. It aired for two seasons before being cancelled in 2020.

Theatre 
Hall made his Broadway debut on November 18, 2021 in Alice Childress's Trouble in Mind.

Personal life
Hall donates his time at least one Sunday a month with the group Hashtag Lunchbag Brooklyn, to make sandwiches for those less fortunate in Brooklyn.

Filmography

Film

Television

References

External links
 

21st-century American male actors
Male actors from South Carolina
African-American male actors
American male film actors
American male television actors
Juilliard School alumni
Living people
People from Anderson, South Carolina
1993 births
21st-century African-American people